The Magnificent Thad Jones is an album by American jazz trumpeter Thad Jones featuring performances recorded in 1956 and released on the Blue Note label.

Reception
The Allmusic review by Michael G. Nastos states: "this quintet makes truly great jazz music together... The musicianship being at such a lofty plateau, so intelligently selected and executed, this CD is a must-have for every collection, and is generally regarded as the very best work of Jones, later big-band recordings with Mel Lewis notwithstanding".

Track listing
 "April in Paris" (Vernon Duke, E. Y. Harburg) - 6:43
 "Billie-Doo" (Thad Jones) - 7:30
 "If I Love Again" (Jack Murray, Ben Oakland) - 7:27
 "If Someone Had Told Me" (Peter DeRose, Charles Tobias) - 5:51
 "Thedia" (Jones) - 10:35
 "I've Got a Crush on You" (George Gershwin, Ira Gershwin) - 7:38 Bonus track on CD reissue
 "Something to Remember You By" (Howard Dietz, Arthur Schwartz) - 3:53 Bonus track on CD reissue

Recorded on July 9 (#7) and 14 (all others), 1956.

Personnel
Thad Jones - trumpet
Billy Mitchell - tenor saxophone
Kenny Burrell - guitar (track 7)
Barry Harris - piano
Percy Heath - bass
Max Roach - drums

References 

Blue Note Records albums
Thad Jones albums
1957 albums
Albums produced by Alfred Lion
Albums recorded at Van Gelder Studio